Marat Zalimgeriyevich Shogenov (born 26 August 1984) is a Russian former professional football player.

Honours
Russian Second Division, Zone Ural-Povolzhye best player: 2010.
Russian Second Division, Zone Ural-Povolzhye best midfielder: 2008, 2009, 2010.
Russian Football National League player of the month: August 2015.

References

External links
 

1984 births
Living people
Russian footballers
Association football midfielders
Russian Premier League players
FC Energiya Volzhsky players
PFC Spartak Nalchik players
FC Orenburg players
FC Fakel Voronezh players
FC Avangard Kursk players